More Sad Hits is the debut studio album by Damon & Naomi, released in 1992 by Shimmy Disc.

Track listing

Personnel 
Adapted from More Sad Hits liner notes.

Musicians
 Kramer – vocals, instruments, arrangements, production, engineering
 Damon Krukowski – vocals, instruments
 Naomi Yang – vocals, instruments, design

Production and additional personnel
 Michael Macioce – photography
 Man Ray – cover art

Release history

References

External links 
 

1992 debut albums
Albums produced by Kramer (musician)
Damon & Naomi albums
Rykodisc albums
Shimmy Disc albums
Sub Pop albums